The Atlantic Coast Conference (founded in 1953) is one of the premier college basketball conferences in NCAA Division I. The current ACC champions are the Duke Blue Devils.

Members

History

The early roots of ACC basketball began primarily thanks to two men: Everett Case and Frank McGuire. Case had been a successful high school coach in Indiana who accepted the head coaching job at North Carolina State at a time that the school's athletic department had decided to focus on competing in football on a level with Duke, then a national power in college football. Case's North Carolina State teams dominated the early years of the ACC with a modern, fast-paced style of play. He became the fastest college basketball coach to reach many "games won" milestones.

Case eventually became known as The Father of ACC Basketball. Despite his success on the court, he may have been even a better promoter off-the-court. Case realized the need to sell his program and university. State had originally started construction on Reynolds Coliseum in 1941, but stopped construction during the war.  It was originally slated to seat 10,000 people, but Case persuaded school officials to expand the arena to 12,400 people.  It opened as the new home court for his team in 1949; at the time, it was the largest on-campus arena in the South.  As such, it was used as the host site for many Southern Conference tournaments, ACC tournaments, and the Dixie Classic, an annual event involving the four ACC teams from North Carolina as well as four other prominent programs from across the nation. The Dixie Classic brought in large revenues for all schools involved and soon became one of the premier sporting events in the South.

Partly to counter Case's personality, as well as the dominant success of his program, North Carolina convinced St. John's head coach Frank McGuire to come to Chapel Hill in 1952. McGuire knew that largely due to Case's influence, basketball was now the major high school athletic event of the region, unlike football in the South. He not only tapped the growing market of high school talent in North Carolina, but also brought several recruits from his home territory in New York City as well. Case and McGuire literally invented a rivalry. Both men realized the benefits created through a rivalry between them. It brought more national attention to both of their programs and increased fan support on both sides. For this reason, they often exchanged verbal jabs at each other in public, while maintaining a secret working relationship in private.

After State was slapped with crippling NCAA sanctions before the 1956–57 season, McGuire's North Carolina team stepped into the breach and delivered the ACC its first national championship. During the Tar Heels' championship run, Greensboro entrepreneur Castleman D. Chesley noticed the popularity that it generated. He hastily cobbled together a five-station television network to broadcast the Final Four. That network began broadcasting regular season ACC games the following season. From that point on, ACC basketball gained large popularity. Chesley's network continued until Metrosports took it over in 1981, handing it to Raycom Sports took it over in 1982; it was the direct ancestor of today's ACC Network.

Scheduling partners
The table below lists each school's permanent men's basketball only scheduling partners after expansion in 2013 and the replacement of Maryland by Louisville in 2014.

Men's basketball titles by school
As explained in the main article about the league, the ACC does not recognize any team other than the conference tournament winner as the champion for a given season. Accordingly, this table sorts the schools primarily by number of tournament wins, using first-place regular season finishes and NCAA championships as tiebreakers where needed.

References

External links
 Official site